Peter dos Santos Barbosa Júnior or simply Peter (born May 17, 1984 in Rio de Janeiro), is a Brazilian right back. He currently plays for Nacional Futebol Clube.

Career
Peter played Campeonato Brasileiro Série A football for Paraná in 2006, whilst on loan from Cruzeiro. He made his Série A debut on 10 September 2006, playing the full 90 minutes in the 1–0 home victory against Fluminense. He scored his first, and so far only, Série A goal on 21 September 2006, against Fortaleza in a 2–0 home win.

He also made one substitute appearance in Série A for Figueirense in 2008.

He has played in Campeonato Brasileiro Série B for Náutico in 2011 and Goiás in 2012, Campeonato Brasileiro Série C for Fortaleza in 2010, and Campeonato Brasileiro Série D for Nacional-AM in 2015.

Honours
 Campeonato Brasileiro Série B:  2012
 Campeonato Cearense: 2010
 Campeonato Goiano: 2012
 Campeonato Amazonense: 2015

External links

1984 births
Living people
Brazilian footballers
Madureira Esporte Clube players
Cruzeiro Esporte Clube players
Clube Náutico Capibaribe players
Ipatinga Futebol Clube players
Uberlândia Esporte Clube players
Associação Portuguesa de Desportos players
Paraná Clube players
Associação Desportiva São Caetano players
Ituano FC players
Figueirense FC players
Goiás Esporte Clube players
Treze Futebol Clube players
Association football defenders
Footballers from Rio de Janeiro (city)